Carl Carlsen (1 July 1880 – 19 May 1958) was a Danish wrestler. He competed in the men's Greco-Roman lightweight at the 1908 Summer Olympics. He also competed at the 1906 Intercalated Games, winning a silver medal.

References

1880 births
1958 deaths
Danish male sport wrestlers
Olympic wrestlers of Denmark
Wrestlers at the 1906 Intercalated Games
Wrestlers at the 1908 Summer Olympics
Sportspeople from Copenhagen
20th-century Danish people